The United States ambassador to South Sudan is the official representative of the president of the United States to the head of state of the Republic of South Sudan.

The government of the United States recognized South Sudan on its independence day, July 9, 2011. On the same day, the existing U.S. consulate (accredited to the Republic of Sudan) in the capital Juba was upgraded to embassy. R. Barrie Walkley, the U.S. Consul General in Juba was appointed to serve as Chargé d'Affaires pending the appointment of a U.S. Ambassador to South Sudan.

On August 18, 2011, President Obama announced his intention to nominate Susan D. Page to be the first U.S. Ambassador to South Sudan. Page served in her role as U.S. Ambassador to South Sudan from October 2011 through July 2015. The current U.S. Ambassador to South Sudan is Michael J. Adler

Chiefs of mission

See also
Embassy of the United States, Juba
South Sudan-United States relations
Foreign relations of South Sudan
Ambassadors of the United States

References

External links
 United States Department of State: Chiefs of Missions for  South Sudan
United States Department of State: South Sudan
 United States Embassy in Juba

South Sudan
 
United States